Alex Giorgi (born 9 December 1957) is an Italian former alpine skier who competed in the 1980 Winter Olympics and 1984 Winter Olympics.

References

External links
 

1957 births
Living people
Italian male alpine skiers
Olympic alpine skiers of Italy
Alpine skiers at the 1980 Winter Olympics
Alpine skiers at the 1984 Winter Olympics
Sportspeople from Brixen